Heteroplopomus barbatus is a species of goby native to the Pacific waters along the coasts of Japan where it inhabits areas with rocky bottoms.  This species is the only known member of its genus.

References

Gobiidae
Monotypic fish genera
Fish described in 1934